

Champions

Major League Baseball
World Series: New York Yankees over Brooklyn Dodgers (4–3)
All-Star Game, July 8 at Shibe Park: National League, 3–2 (5 innings)

Other champions
All-American Girls Professional Baseball League: South Bend Blue Sox
College World Series: Holy Cross
Japan Series: Yomiuri Giants over Nankai Hawks (4–2)
Little League World Series: Norwalk National, Norwalk, Connecticut
Winter Leagues
1952 Caribbean Series: Senadores de San Juan
Cuban League: Leones del Habana
Dominican Republic League: Águilas Cibaeñas
Mexican Pacific League: Tacuarineros de Culiacán
Panamanian League: Carta Vieja Yankees
Puerto Rican League: Senadores de San Juan
Venezuelan League: Cervecería Caracas

Awards and honors
Baseball Hall of Fame
Harry Heilmann
Paul Waner
MLB Most Valuable Player Award
Bobby Shantz, Philadelphia Athletics, P
 Hank Sauer, Chicago Cubs, OF
MLB Rookie of the Year Award
Harry Byrd, Philadelphia Athletics, P
Joe Black, Brooklyn Dodgers, P
The Sporting News Player of the Year Award
Robin Roberts, Philadelphia Phillies
The Sporting News Manager of the Year Award
Eddie Stanky, St. Louis Cardinals

MLB statistical leaders

Major league baseball final standings

American League final standings

National League final standings

Events

January
January 31 – Harry Heilmann with 203 votes, and Paul Waner with 195, become the newest members of the Hall of Fame.

February
February 16 – Hall of Famer Honus Wagner, 77, retires after 40 years as a major league player and coach. He receives a pension from the Pittsburgh Pirates, with whom he spent most of those years.
February 21 – Thomas Fine of Cuba's Leones de la Habana hurled the first no-hitter in Caribbean Series history, a 1–0 masterpiece against Al Papai and Venezuela's Cervecería Caracas. Through 2013, it has been the only no-hitter pitched in Series history.
February 26 – Thomas Fine was three outs from consecutive no-hitters in the Caribbean Series,  having allowed a single in the ninth inning to break it up, in an 11–3 Cuba's victory over Panama's Carta Vieja Yankees. His 17 consecutive hitless innings pitched record still as the longest in Series history.

April
April 23 – Bob Cain and the St. Louis Browns defeat Bob Feller and the Cleveland Indians, 1–0, in a game in which both pitchers throw a one-hitter.
April 30
Veteran Negro leagues catcher Quincy Trouppe makes his major league debut with the Cleveland Indians. At 39 years of age, he is one of the oldest rookies in major league history. Three days later, Trouppe is behind the plate when relief pitcher Toothpick Sam Jones enters the game, forming the first black battery in American League history.
Ted Williams hits a two-run home run to break a 3–3 tie on "Ted Williams Day" at Fenway Park. It was Williams' final game of the season before his departure for the Korean War to serve as a Marine fighter pilot.

May
May 13 – Ron Necciai of the Class-D Bristol Twins strikes out 27 batters while pitching a 7–0 no-hitter against the Welch Miners in an Appalachian League game. Four of the Welch hitters reach base on a walk, an error, a hit by pitch, and a passed ball charged to Twins' catcher Harry Dunlop on a swinging third strike. But 27 strikeouts are recorded on the night, including four in the ninth inning, as a result of Dunlop's miscue, while one batter is retired on a grounder in the second inning.
May 15 – After pitching four no-hitters in the minors, 33-year-old Virgil Trucks of the Detroit Tigers pitches his first in the majors, a 1–0 blanking of the Washington Senators. Vic Wertz's two-out home run in the ninth inning off Bob Porterfield wins the game at Briggs Stadium.
May 21 – At Ebbets Field, the Brooklyn Dodgers set a Major League record by scoring 15 runs in the first inning of a 19–1 pounding of the Cincinnati Reds. All nine Dodgers in the starting lineup both score a run and bat in a run in that first inning.
May 29 – Boston Red Sox pitcher Mickey McDermott faces 27 batters and fire a one-hitter to beat the Washington Senators, 1–0, at Fenway Park. Mel Hoderlein's fourth-inning single is the only Washington hit and he is thrown out while trying to stretch the hit into a double.

June
June 11 – Sammy White clouts a walk-off grand slam in the ninth inning off pitcher Satchel Paige to give the Boston Red Sox an 11–9 victory over the St. Louis Browns at Fenway Park.
June 14- The Milwaukee Braves purchase the contract of Hank Aaron from the Indianapolis Clowns and assign him to the Eau Claire Bears, who were the Braves class C farm team in the Northern League.  
June 19 – Carl Erskine of the Brooklyn Dodgers tosses a 5–0 no-hitter against the Chicago Cubs at Ebbets Field. Erskine would pitch his second career no-hitter on May 12,  against the New York Giants, 3–0, at Ebbets Field.
June 25 – Chicago White Sox shortstop Chico Carrasquel fractures his little finger in a play‚ which drops Chicago four games out of first place. Carrasquel will reinjure it on July 9 and be out of the lineup until August 19. The injury to Carrasquel‚ the starting shortstop for the American League in the MLB All-Star Game, is a key damage component as the White Sox will finish in third place.

July
July 8 – In a rain-shortened affair at Shibe Park, home of the Philadelphia Phillies, the National League tops the American League, 3–2 (5 innings), in the All-Star Game. Jackie Robinson and Hank Sauer each homer for the NL.
July 15
Detroit Tigers first baseman Walt Dropo collects seven consecutive hits over the course of doubleheader against the Washington Senators. Combined with the five consecutive hits he recorded on July 14, Dropo establishes the American League and Major League record for consecutive hits in consecutive plate appearances with twelve base hits.
Eddie Joost of the Philadelphia Athletics became the second player to hit a walk-off grand slam against St. Louis Browns pitcher Satchel Paige this season, in a 7–6 victory at Shibe Park (The first being the Boston Red Sox's Sammy White on June 11). Paige is the first pitcher in Major League history to surrender two walk-off homers in the same season, according to the Elias Sports Bureau.

August
August 15 – Detroit Tigers pitcher Virgil Trucks hurled his second no-hitter of the season, a 1–0 shutout over the host New York Yankees. Previously, Trucks held the Washington Senators without a hit on May 15. Besides, Trucks is one of five pitchers to throw two no-hitters in a season, being the others Johnny Vander Meer (1938), Allie Reynolds (1951), Nolan Ryan (1973) and Roy Halladay (2010), as one of his no-hitters came in the postseason.

September
September 13 – Buffalo Bisons outfielder Frank Carswell wins the International League batting title with a .344 average, leading also the league with 30 home runs while driving in 101 runs and slugging .587.

October
October 1 – In Game 1 of the 1952 World Series, the Brooklyn Dodgers defeat the New York Yankees, 4–2, at Ebbets Field behind relief ace Joe Black, who started only two games during the regular season.
October 7 – The New York Yankees defeat the Brooklyn Dodgers, 4–2, in the decisive Game 7 of the World Series to win their fourth straight World Championship title – tying the mark they set between 1936 and 1939 and fifteenth overall. Billy Martin saves the day by snaring a two-out, bases-loaded infield pop off the bat of Jackie Robinson. Gil Hodges goes hitless again and is 0-for-21 in the Series. This is the Yankees' third defeat of the Dodgers in six years.

November
November 12 – Bobby Shantz, who posted a 24–7 record with 152 strikeouts and a 2.48 ERA for the Philadelphia Athletics, is selected the AL Most Valuable Player by the Baseball Writers' Association of America and the AL Pitcher of the Year by The Sporting News.
November 22 – Philadelphia Athletics pitcher Harry Byrd, who won 15 games and posted and a 3.31 ERA, is selected American League Rookie of the Year.
November 28 – International League President Frank Shaughnessy reveals plans to form two new major leagues by merging the top teams in the American Association and the top teams from the IL. Shaughnessy thinks that in five to six years, Major League Baseball will elevate these two leagues, along with the Pacific Coast League, which nearly has MLB status now.
November 30 – On a local New York TV program, Jackie Robinson of the Brooklyn Dodgers charges that the New York Yankees management is racist for its failure to bring up a black player. Yankees executive George Weiss denies the allegations.

December
December 2:
The Pittsburgh Pirates draft relief pitcher Elroy Face from the Montreal Royals, the top minor league affiliate of the Brooklyn Dodgers. During a 15-year career with the Pirates, Face will lead the National League in saves three times and will be a three-time All-Star, as well as his amazing 18 relief wins in  remains a major league record.
Brooklyn Dodgers executive Buzzie Bavasi dismisses the New York Yankees reaction to the Jackie Robinson racism charges. Commissioner Ford Frick plans no action against Robinson. Two days earlier, Robinson had called the Yankees a racist organization for its failure to promote a black player to the parent club.

Movies
The Pride of St. Louis
The Winning Team

Births

January
January   2 – Greg Heydeman
January   6 – Bob Adams
January   7 – Doug Capilla
January   7 – Bob Gorinski
January   9 – Don Hopkins
January   9 – Joe Wallis
January 13 – Bob Galasso
January 14 – Terry Forster
January 14 – Wayne Gross
January 17 – Pete LaCock
January 17 – Darrell Porter
January 21 – Mike Krukow
January 22 – Ramón Avilés
January 24 – John Scott
January 26 – Morris Nettles

February
February   2 – Warren Brusstar
February   3 – Fred Lynn
February 14 – Will McEnaney
February 16 – Barry Foote
February 16 – Jerry Hairston, Sr.
February 18 – Marc Hill
February 19 – Dave Cheadle
February 26 – Dennis Kinney
February 27 – Henry Cruz
February 28 – Orlando Álvarez
February 29 – Al Autry

March
March   1 – Bob Davis
March   5 – Mike Squires
March   6 – Eduardo Rodríguez
March 15 – Steve Stroughter
March 17 – Jerry Tabb
March 19 – Perry Hill
March 20 – Rick Langford
March 20 – Greg Terlecky
March 21 – Fernando Arroyo
March 22 – Eddie Bane
March 22 – Eric Rasmussen
March 29 – Bill Castro

April
April   1 – Mike Bacsik
April   6 – Steve Waterbury
April   9 – Ed Plank
April 20 – Joe Gilbert
April 24 – Pat Zachry
April 29 – Bob McClure
April 29 – Ron Washington

May
May   1 – Bob Allietta
May   4 – Fred Andrews
May   9 – Sam Mejías
May 15 – Rick Waits
May 17 – Porfi Altamirano
May 19 – Dan Ford
May 23 – Pepe Mangual
May 23 – Butch Metzger
May 29 – Fred Holdsworth
May 31 – Dwight Bernard

June
June   2 – Mike Davey
June 13 – Ernie Whitt
June 21 – Dave Downs
June 22 – Randy Scarbery
June 26 – Steve Bowling
June 28 – Joe Sambito

July
July   1 – Kerry Dineen
July   3 – Ryan Kurosaki
July   3 – John Verhoeven
July   5 – Don DeMola
July   6 – Cardell Camper
July 21 – Steve Smith
July 24 – Jerry Augustine
July 27 – Rich Dauer
July 27 – Bump Wills
July 30 – Mickey Mahler

August
August   1 – Greg Gross
August   2 – Art James
August   2 – Bombo Rivera
August   3 – Bob Davidson
August   3 – Dan Meyer
August   8 – Mike Ivie
August   8 – Greg Mahlberg
August 16 – Al Holland
August 19 – Tim Blackwell
August 20 – Bobby Cuellar
August 20 – Lance Rautzhan
August 21 – Chip Lang
August 22 – Gary Beare
August 23 – Jerry White
August 27 – Marshall Edwards
August 27 – Mike Edwards

September
September   2 – Nate Snell
September   7 – Rick Sweet
September   8 – Larry McCall
September   9 – Jerry Mumphrey
September 15 – Don Collins
September 18 – Sam Bowen
September 20 – Jim Wilhelm
September 21 – Art Gardner
September 21 – Gary Gray
September 22 – Dell Alston
September 23 – Dennis Lamp
September 23 – Jim Morrison
September 23 – Pat Scanlon
September 24 – Rod Gilbreath
September 25 – Sal Butera
September 25 – Mike Stanton

October
October   1 – Bob Myrick
October   2 – Terry Cornutt
October   7 – John Caneira
October 18 – Allen Ripley
October 18 – Jerry Royster
October 20 – Dave Collins
October 23 – John Poff
October 23 – Randy Tate
October 24 – Omar Moreno
October 24 – Angel Torres
October 24 – Reggie Walton
October 25 – Rowland Office
October 25 – Roy Smalley
October 27 – Gil Flores
October 27 – Bill Travers
October 27 – Pete Vuckovich
October 30 – Tom Brennan
October 31 – Joe West

November
November   4 – Doug Corbett
November   5 – Tom Carroll
November   8 – John Denny
November   8 – Jerry Remy
November   9 – Jim Riggleman
November   9 – Dave Wehrmeister
November   9 – Rick Williams
November 13 – John Sutton
November 15 – Tom Donohue
November 16 – Glenn Burke
November 17 – Dave Frost
November 18 – Dan Briggs
November 18 – Steve Henderson
November 21 – Bill Almon

December
December   1 – Dan Warthen
December   3 – Larry Anderson
December   6 – Chuck Baker
December   6 – Jeff Schneider
December   9 – Bruce Boisclair
December 11 – Rob Andrews
December 15 – Bud Bulling
December 16 – Tommy Bianco
December 21 – Joaquín Andújar
December 23 – Santo Alcalá
December 25 – Julio González
December 27 – Mark Budaska
December 27 – Craig Reynolds
December 28 – Ray Knight
December 28 – José Sosa
December 29 – Dennis Werth

Deaths

January
January   6 – Frank Oberlin, 75, pitcher who played for the Boston Americans and Washington Senators over four seasons spanning 1906–1910.
January   8 – Art Evans, 40, pitcher for the 1932 Chicago White Sox.
January 10 – Bones Ely, 88, one of the top defensive shortstops of his generation and also a versatile two-way player, whose 19-season professional career included stints with eight major league teams in three different leagues in a span of fourteen seasons between 1884 and 1902. 
January 14 – Rube Sellers, 70, outfielder who played for the Boston Doves in its 1910 season. 
January 15 – Ben Houser, 68, first baseman who played with the Philadelphia Athletics during the 1910 season, and for the Boston Rustlers and Braves from 1911 to 1912.
January 17 – Walter O. Briggs Sr., 74, industrialist and co-owner of the Detroit Tigers from 1919 to 1935, and sole owner from 1935 until his death.
January 17 – Solly Salisbury, 75, pitcher who played in 1902 with the Philadelphia Phillies.  
January 20 – Ollie Pickering, 81, outfielder for six major league clubs in three different leagues between 1896 and 1908, who entered the record books as the first ever batter in American League history, when he faced Chicago White Sox pitcher Roy Patterson as a member of the Cleveland Blues on April 24, 1901.
January 24 – Ángel Aragón, 61, third baseman for the New York Yankees in three seasons from 1914 to 1917, who was also the first Cuban and Latin American player to wear a Yankees uniform.
January 24 – Dick Wright, 61, catcher who made four game appearances for the Brooklyn Tip-Tops of the outlaw Federal League in 1915.

February
February   5 – Esty Chaney, 61, pitcher who played from 1913 to 1914 for the Boston Red Sox (1913) and Brooklyn Tip-Tops.
February   5 – Mike Hopkins, 79, catcher who appeared in just one game for the Pittsburgh Pirates in 1902, hitting a single and one double in two at-bats to finish his major league career with a 1.000 batting average and a 1.500 slugging percentage.
February   6 – Del Paddock, 64, third baseman who divided his playing time between the Chicago White Sox and the New York Highlanders in the 1912 season.
February 12 – Charlie Manlove, 89, 19th century catcher who played in 1884 for the Altoona Mountain City of the Union Association and the New York Gothams of the National League.

March
March 11 – Pete Daglia, 46, pitcher for the 1932 Chicago White Sox.
March 13 – Vincent Maney, 65, shortstop for the Detroit Tigers in the 1912 season.
March 19 – Lefty Thomas, 48, pitcher who played in eight games in 1925 and 1926 for the Washington Senators.
March 20 – Harry Bay, 74, outfielder for the Cincinnati Reds and the Cleveland Bronchos and Naps in a span of eight seasons from 1901 to 1908, who led the American League in stolen bases in 1903 and 1904.
March 23 – Steve Sundra, 41, pitcher for the New York Yankees, Washington Senators and St. Louis Browns over eight seasons spanning 1936–1946, as well as a member of the 1938 and 1939 World Series champion Yankees teams.
March 30 – John Gallagher, 60, second baseman who played in 1915 for the Baltimore Terrapins of the Federal League.
March 30 – Deacon Phillippe, 79, pitcher who played for the Louisville Colonels in 1899 and for the Pittsburgh Pirates from 1900 through 1911, whose 13-season career was highlighted by pitching a no-hitter in his seventh career game with the Colonels, winning four National League pennants and the 1909 World Series with the Pirates, while winning three games of the 1903 World Series against the eventual champions Boston Americans, and prevailing in a pitching duel with Cy Young in Game 1 of the best-of-nine series, as his five decisions in the World Series are still a record for a pitcher.

April
April   3 – Dick Harley, 79, left fielder who played from 1897 through 1903 for the St. Louis Browns, Cleveland Spiders, Cincinnati Reds, Detroit Tigers and Chicago Cubs.
April   3 – Phenomenal Smith, 87, whose pitching career lasted eight seasons from 1884 to 1891 while playing for six different clubs, as he earned the sumptuous nickname when he pitched a no-hitter for the Newark Domestics of the American Association on October 3, 1885, in which he struck out 16 Baltimore Orioles batters.
April   5 – Ray Jacobs, 50, infielder who made two pinch-hit appearances for the Chicago Cubs in its 1918 season.
April   8 – Willie Ludolph, 52, pitcher for the 1924 Detroit Tigers. 
April 21 – Sheldon Lejeune, 68, outfielder who played with the Brooklyn Dodgers in 1911 and for the Pittsburgh Pirates in 1915.
April 30 – Frank Madden, 59, catcher who played in two games for the Pittsburgh Rebels in 1914.

May
May   1 – Ernie Johnson, 64, middle infielder and third baseman whose 10-year career included stints with four teams from 1912 to 1925, being also a contributor to the 1923 World Series Champion Yankees, slashing .297/.333/.385 for the club in the regular season, and scoring the series-deciding run as a pinch runner in Game 6 against the New York Giants.
May   4 – Burt Keeley, 72, pitcher for the Washington Senators in the 1908 and 1909 seasons.
May   6 – Rube Dessau, 69, pitcher who played with the Boston Doves in 1907 and for the Brooklyn Superbas in 1910.
May   6 – Harry Berte, 79, middle infielder for the 1903 St. Louis Cardinals.
May   7 – Red Bluhm, 57, slick fielding first baseman in the minor leagues, who made one appearance as a pinch hitter for the Boston Red Sox in 1918.
May 12 – Charlie Young, 59, pitcher who played for the Baltimore Terrapins of the outlaw Federal League in 1915.
May 14 – Bert Cunningham, 86, pitcher who played from 1887 through 1901 for the Brooklyn Grays, Baltimore Orioles, Philadelphia Athletics, Buffalo Bisons, Louisville Colonels and Chicago Orphans, 
May 14 – Red Dooin, 72, catcher (1902–1914) and player-manager (1910–1914) for the Philadelphia Phillies who caught 1,219 games for the team and posted a record of 392–370 (.514) as its skipper; also played for the Cincinnati Reds (1915) and New York Giants (1915–1916).
May 16 – Sal Campfield, 52, pitcher who played for the New York Giants in its 1896 season.
May 18 – Spec Harkness, 64, pitcher who played from 1910 to 1911 for the Cleveland Naps.
May 23 – Bill McGilvray, 69, outfielder for the 1908 Cincinnati Reds.
May 27 – Lew Ritter, 76, catcher who played for the Brooklyn Superbas over seven seasons from 1902 to 1908.
May 29 – Doc Lavan, 61, shortstop whose 16-year pro career included stints in the major leagues with the St. Louis Browns, Philadelphia Athletics, Washington Senators and St. Louis Cardinals in a span of twelve seasons from 1913 to 1924.
May 30 – Albert Lasker, 72, advertising executive and owner or part-owner of the Chicago Cubs between 1916 and 1925.

June
June   5 – Bruno Haas, 61, pitcher for the 1915 Philadelphia Athletics.
June   9 – Bob McHale, 82, 19th century pitcher who played for the Washington Senators of the National League in 1898.
June 17 – Al Atkinson, 91, pitcher who played for the Philadelphia Athletics, Chicago Browns and Baltimore Monumentals in 1884 and again with Philadelphia from 1886 to 1887; one of the few pitchers to throw two no-hitters in the early days of baseball, first against the Pittsburgh Alleghenys on May 24, 1884, and the second on May 1, 1886, against the New York Metropolitans, but achieved prominence in 1888 when he set a season record with 307 strikeouts in the International Association, a mark that stood until 1923, when Lefty Grove broke it with 320 SO while pitching for the Baltimore Orioles in the then International League.
June 17 – Julio Bonetti, 40, pitcher who played for the St. Louis Browns and Chicago Cubs over part of three seasons spanning 1937–1940, one of only seven Italian-born players in  Major League Baseball history.
June 19 – Dick Crutcher, 62, pitcher for the Boston Braves in part of two seasons from 1914 to 1915.
June 20 – John Kalahan, 73, catcher who appeared in one game with the Philadelphia Athletics during the 1903 season.
June 21 – Andy Dunning, 80, 19th century pitcher who played with the Pittsburgh Alleghenys in 1889 and for the New York Giants in 1891.

July
July   3 – Fred Tenney, 80, first baseman and manager whose career lasted 17 seasons from 1894 to 1911, who was ranked behind only Hal Chase among first basemen of the Deadball Era, being also considered the originator of the 3-6-3 double play, while leading the National League in putouts in 1905 and 1907–1908 as well as in assists each year from 1901 through 1907, setting a major-league record with 152 in 1905 that lasted until Mickey Vernon topped it in 1949, hitting over .300 seven times and retiring with a .294/.371/.358 slash line, including 2,231 hits, 1,134 runs scored and 688 runs batted in.
July 11 – Dutch Leonard, 60, left-handed pitcher for the Boston Red Sox and Detroit Tigers over eleven seasons from 1913 to 1925, who earned two World Series rings with Boston in 1915 and 1916, while leading the major leagues with an earned run average of 0.96 in 1914, setting a modern-era season record that still stands.

August
August   1 – Phil Douglas, 62, hard-throwing pitcher who posted a 94–93 record and 2.80 earned run average for five teams in a nine-year career, winning 15 games with a 2.08 ERA in the 1921 season and then two wins in the 1921 World Series to help the New York Giants win the series, going 11–4 with a National League leading 2.63 ERA in 1922, before being banned for life under Commissioner Landis due to a quarrel with Giants manager John McGraw.
August   8 – Bob Neighbors, 34, shortstop for the 1939 St. Louis Browns, who later served as a pilot in the Korean War and was shot down, making him the most recent major leaguer to be killed in battle.
August 13 – Hal Haid, 54, relief pitcher who played with the St. Louis Browns, St. Louis Cardinals, Boston Braves and Chicago White Sox over parts of six seasons spanning 1919–1933.
August 19 – George McAvoy, 68, pinch hitter who appeared in one game with the 1914 Philadelphia Phillies.
August 20 – Red Owens, 77, second baseman who played in 1899 with the Philadelphia Phillies and for the Brooklyn Superbas in 1905.
August 20 – Ned Pettigrew, 71, who pinch-hit in two games for the Buffalo Blues of the outlaw Federal League in 1914.
August 21 – Jack Ryan, 83, big league catcher who played from 1889 through 1913 for six clubs in three different leagues, completing a career that lasted four decades, a feat which has been attained by only 29 players in Major League history.
August 25 – Harry Maupin, 80, 19th century pitcher who played in 1898 with the St. Louis Browns and for the Cleveland Spiders in 1899.
August 30 – Arky Vaughan, 40, Hall of Fame and nine-time All-Star shortstop, who hit .300 or better in each of his first 10 major league seasons, all with the Pittsburgh Pirates from 1932 to 1941, winning the National League batting crown with a .385 average in 1935, while leading the league in runs and triples three years apiece, as well as stolen bases once; died tragically when a sudden storm capsized his fishing boat on Lost Lake, near his Northern California home.

September
September   3 – Bert Daly, 71, backup infielder for the 1903 Philadelphia Athletics.
September   4 – Butch Schmidt, 66, first baseman who played for the New York Highlanders and Boston Braves in a span of four seasons from 1909 to 1915, being also a member of the 1914 Miracle Braves, the first MLB club ever to win a World Series in just four games. 
September   8 – Ed Hearne, 64, shortstop who played briefly with the Boston Red Sox in 1910.
September 13 – Al Clauss, 61, pitcher for the 1913 Detroit Tigers.
September 16 – Earl Sheely, 59, first baseman who posted a .300 batting average with the Chicago White Sox, Pittsburgh Pirates and Boston Braves in nine seasons between 1921 and 1931, serving later as a scout for the Boston Red Sox and general manager for the Triple-A Seattle Rainiers, earning a Pacific Coast League Hall of Fame induction for his contributions to the league over the years.
September 28 – Zeke Wrigley, 78, 19th century shortstop who played from 1896 through 1899 for the Washington Senators, New York Giants and Brooklyn Superbas.
September 30 – Jerry Freeman, 72, first baseman for the Washington Senators from 1908 to 1909.

October
October   4 – Bill Zimmerman, 65, German outfielder who played for the Brooklyn Robins in 1915.
October   8 – Joe Adams, 74, pitcher for the 1902 St. Louis Cardinals, who later became a successful manager in the minor leagues, being a mentor for future Hall of Famers Frank Chance and Ray Schalk, among others, while earning the nickname of Godfather of the Eastern Illinois League, according to the 1908 Spalding Guide.
October 11 – Roy Beecher, 68, pitcher for the New York Giants from 1907 to 1908.
October 14 – Jim Banning, 87, 19th century catcher who played for the Washington Nationals of the National League in parts of two seasonsd from 1888 to 1889.
October 17 – Vince Shields, 51, Canadian pitcher for the 1924 St. Louis Cardinals.
October 22 – Howard McGraner, 63, pitcher who played with the Cincinnati Reds in 1912.
October 26 – Tom Angley, 48, backup catcher for the Chicago Cubs in its 1929 season.
October 26 – Mike Murphy, 64, catcher who played with  the St. Louis Cardinals in 1912 and for the Philadelphia Athletics in 1916.
October 28 – Bob Lawson, 77, pitcher who played with the Boston Beaneaters in 1901 and for the original Baltimore Orioles in 1902.

November
November   1 – Wally Clement, 72, outfielder who played in 1908 with the Philadelphia Phillies, and for the Brooklyn Superbas in 1909.
November   1 – Ed McNichol, 73, pitcher for the  1904 Boston Beaneaters.
November   3 – Frank Smith, 73,  pitcher who played for the Chicago White Sox, Boston Red Sox, Cincinnati Reds, Baltimore Terrapins and Brooklyn Tip-Tops during 11 seasons spanning 1904–1915, while pitching two no-hitters and winning over 20 games twice, ending his career with a 139–111 record and 2.59 ERA in 2,274 innings.
November 20 – Fred McMullin, best known for his involvement in the 1919 World Series Black Sox Scandal, died in Los Angeles, California, at the age of 61. McMullin, a reserve infielder with the Chicago White Sox, was one of the eight White Sox players that were banned from baseball for gambling on the series, won by the Cincinnati Reds. McMullin began his major league career in 1914, as a shortstop for the Detroit Tigers before making the Chicago club in 1916. Afterwards, he was a member of the 1917 World Series Champion White Sox. In his final years, he suffered from arteriosclerosis, a heart ailment. Just over a month after his 61st birthday, he had a stroke that caused hemorrhaging in the brain and died a day later.
November 26 – Warren Gill, 73, first baseman who played for the Pittsburgh Pirates in its 1908 season.
November 29 – Arlie Latham, 92, "The Freshest Man on Earth", who played for the Buffalo Bisons, St. Louis Browns, Chicago Pirates, Cincinnati Reds, Washington Senators and New York Giants in a span of 17 seasons from 1880 to 1909; known for his practical jokes and setting the MLB career record to date for the most errors at third base, with 822, while ranking seventh on the all-time list for stolen bases with 742, ending his career with a .269 batting average, 1,478 runs scored, 836 hits, 27 home runs and 563 and runs batted in.

December
December   6 – Don Hurst, 47, first baseman who played from 1928 through 1934 for the Philadelphia Phillies and Chicago Cubs, leading the National League with 143 RBI in 1932. 
December 14 – Frank Hansford, 77, pitcher for the 1898 Brooklyn Bridegrooms.
December 28 – Deacon Jones, 60,  pitcher who played from 1916 to 1918 for the Detroit Tigers.
December 29 – Bob Meinke, 65, shortstop who appeared in two games for the Cincinnati Reds in 1910.

Sources

External links

 Baseball Reference – 1952 MLB season summary
Baseball Reference – MLB Players born in 1952
Baseball Reference – MLB Players died in 1952